Ouy is a surname. Notable people with the surname include:

Achille Ouy (1889–1959), French philosopher and sociologist
Gilbert Ouy (1924–2011), French historian, medievalist, paleographer, and librarian